Charles Henri Joseph Binet (8 April 1869 – 15 July 1936) was a French Archbishop of Besançon and Cardinal.

Biography
Charles Binet was born in Juvigny, France, and was educated at the Seminary of Saint-Sulpice, Paris, and at the Seminary of Notre Dame des Champs. He was ordained on October 22, 1893, in Soissons. He worked in the diocese doing pastoral work until 1895. He served as a faculty member of the Seminary of Soissons until 1914, during which time he was also appointed as Diocesan archivist in 1900. He served in the French Army during World War I. He was appointed vicar general and archdeacon of the diocese of Laon on 13 February 1919.

Episcopate
Pope Benedict XV appointed him Bishop of Soissons on June 16, 1920. He was consecrated, August 24, 1920, cathedral of Soissons, by Cardinal Louis Luçon, Archbishop of Reims. He was promoted to the metropolitan see of Besançon on October 31, 1927, but continued at the previous see as apostolic administrator until May 1, 1928.

Cardinalate
He was created and proclaimed Cardinal-Priest of S. Prisca by Pope Pius XI in the consistory of December 19, 1927. He died on July 15, 1936, and is buried in Besançon.

References

1869 births
1936 deaths
20th-century French cardinals
Archbishops of Besançon
Bishops of Soissons
20th-century Roman Catholic archbishops in France
French military personnel of World War I
Burials at Besançon Cathedral
Grand Crosses of the Order of Saint-Charles